The Caudron C.560 Rafale II was a French competition aircraft built in the mid-1930s. It was intended to participate in the Coupe Deutsch de la Meurthe race of 1935 and was powered by a  Renault 12R inverted V-12.

References

C.560
1930s French sport aircraft
Single-engined tractor aircraft
Low-wing aircraft
Aircraft first flown in 1935